Pacsa is a town in Zala County, Hungary.

External links 

 Street map 

Populated places in Zala County